Downtown Anchorage is a neighborhood in the U.S. city of Anchorage, Alaska. Considered the central business district of Anchorage, Downtown has many office buildings, cultural points of interest, shopping areas, as well as dining and nightlife attractions. Today's Downtown was the original site of the Anchorage Land Auction in 1915, which gave rise to today's present-day grid street pattern. The actual original townsite was a tent city located off the banks of Ship Creek, at present-day Government Hill.

Downtown is a major employment center for the greater Anchorage region, drawing commuters from as far away as the Matanuska-Susitna Borough. The largest industries were services, government, and retail.

Downtown's architecture substantially defines the Anchorage skyline today. The tallest buildings in Alaska are located here, most notably the ConocoPhillips Building and the Atwood Building.

Downtown Anchorage's cleanliness, safety, and vitality is strongly controlled and advocated by the Anchorage Downtown Partnership.

See also 
History of Anchorage, Alaska
Neighborhoods of Anchorage, Alaska

References

External links 
Anchorage Downtown Partnership, Ltd.
 

Anchorage
Economy of Anchorage, Alaska
Neighborhoods in Anchorage, Alaska